Lionel David Barnett CB FBA (21 October 1871 – 28 January 1960) was an English orientalist.

The son of a Liverpool banker, Barnett was educated at Liverpool High School, Liverpool Institute, University College, Liverpool and Trinity College, Cambridge, where he took a first class degree in classics and was three times a winner of a Browne medal.

In 1899, he joined the British Museum as Assistant Keeper in the Department of Oriental Printed Books and Manuscripts. In 1908 he became Keeper, remaining in the post until his retirement in 1936. He was also Professor of Sanskrit at University College, London from 1906 to 1917, founding Lecturer in Sanskrit at the School of Oriental Studies (1917–1948), Lecturer in Ancient Indian History and Epigraphy (1922–1948), and Librarian of the School (1940–1947). In 1948, at the age of 77, he rejoined the British Museum, which was desperately short of staff, as an Assistant Keeper, remaining there until his death.

In 1932, Barnett became entirely blind in one eye and retained only partial vision in the other.

He was made a Companion of the Order of the Bath (CB) in 1937.

References 
Citations

Sources
 Oxford Dictionary of National Biography
 Obituary, Jewish Chronicle, Feb, 5 1960, p. 1

External links

 
 
 

1871 births
1960 deaths
Alumni of the University of Liverpool
Alumni of Trinity College, Cambridge
English orientalists
English Jews
Companions of the Order of the Bath
Academics from Liverpool
Academics of SOAS University of London
Academics of University College London